Paul Ritter (November 17, 1865 - May 31, 1921) was Ambassador of Switzerland to the United States from 1909 to 1917.

Biography
He was born in 1865 in Basel, Switzerland.

He was consul general at Yokohama from 1892 to 1906. He then was the Ambassador of Switzerland to Japan.

He was the Ambassador of Switzerland to the United States from 1909 to 1917. He represented the German Empire in the United States when diplomatic relations were severed during World War I on February 3, 1917.

In 1917 he was replaced as ambassador by Hans Sulzer.

He was reassigned to The Hague until he retired in 1920.

He died of apoplexy in Zurich, Switzerland on May 31, 1921.

Weblinks

References

1865 births
1921 deaths
Ambassadors of Switzerland to the United States
Switzerland in World War I
German Empire in World War I